Steve Herman was a senior administrator for the United States Environmental Protection Agency (EPA).

He is notable for playing an important role in several high-profile cases.

After leaving the EPA Herman became a director of Beveridge & Diamond.

References

Administrators of the United States Environmental Protection Agency
Living people
Year of birth missing (living people)